The 36th Saturn Awards, honoring the best in science fiction, fantasy and horror film and television in 2009 were presented on June 24, 2010, in Burbank, California. The most awards of the night were won by Avatar, winning all ten of its nominations. The film also won the Saturn Award for Best Special Edition DVD Release the following year.

Below is a complete list of nominees and winners. Winners are highlighted in boldface.

Winners and nominees

Film

Television

Programs

Acting

DVD

Best Local Stage Production

Best Local Stage Production: Fantasy/Musical
Mary Poppins (Ahmanson Theatre)

Best Local Stage Production: Play/Dramatic Musical
Parade (Mark Taper Forum)

Best Local Stage Production: Small Theatre
 Fellowship: The Musical (Falcon Theatre)

Special awards

Visionary Award
 James Cameron

Life Career Award
 Irvin Kershner

The George Pal Memorial Award
 Roberto Orci & Alex Kurtzman

The Producers Showcase Award
 Lauren Shuler Donner

Multiple Nominations
The following films received multiple nominations:
10 nominations: Avatar
8 nominations: Sherlock Holmes
7 nominations: Inglourious Basterds and Watchmen
6 nominations: District 9 and Star Trek
5 nominations: Drag Me to Hell and The Lovely Bones
4 nominations: Brothers, Harry Potter and the Half-Blood Prince and Where the Wild Things Are
3 nominations: The Book of Eli and Red Cliff
2 nominations: 2012, The Box, The Hurt Locker, The Imaginarium of Doctor Parnassus, Moon, The Road, The Time Traveler's Wife, The Twilight Saga: New Moon, Up and Zombieland

References

External links

 The Official Saturn Awards Site

Saturn Awards ceremonies
Saturn
2009 film awards
2010 in California
2009 television awards